The Most Excellent (Spanish: Excelentísimo Señor (male) or Excelentísima Señora (female), literally "Most Excellent Sir/Madam") is an honorific  prefix that is traditionally applied to certain people in Spain and certain Spanish-speaking countries. Following Spanish tradition, it is an ex officio style (the holder has it as long as they remain in office, in the most important positions of state) and is used in written documents and very formal occasions.

The prefix is similar (but not equal) to that of "His/Her Excellency", but in the 19th century "The Most Excellent" began to replace the former.

The use of the prefix Excellency was re-introduced in Francoist Spain by Generalísimo Francisco Franco himself, who was formally styled as Su Excelencia el Jefe del Estado ("His Excellency The Head of State"), while his ministers and senior government officials continued using the prefix "The Most Excellent".

The prefix "The Most Illustrious" (Ilustrísimo/a Señor/a) is the lower version, and is mostly used for non-Grandee titled nobles in Spain and some other officeholders.

In the Kingdom of Spain
The following State and Government officials receive the style "The Most Excellent":

Household of His Majesty The King
 The Head of the Household
 The Secretary General
 The Head of the Military Chamber

Executive power
Central government

 The President of the Government (Prime Minister) and former Presidents of the Government
 Vice Presidents of the Government and former vice presidents
 Government Ministers and former ministers
 Secretaries of State
 The Undersecretary of the Ministry of Foreign Affairs
 Government's Delegates to the Autonomous Communities

Autonomous communities
 The Presidents of the Autonomous communities of Spain
 Counselors (ministers) of the Autonomous Communities

Legislative power
 The President of the Congress of Deputies
 The President of the Senate
 Members of the Bureau of the Congress of deputies
 Members of the Bureau of the Senate
 Members of the Bureaus of the Autonomic Legislatures

Constitutional Court and judiciary
 Justices of the Constitutional Court
 Members of the General Council of the Judiciary
 Justices of the Supreme Court
 The Attorney General of the State
 The Head prosecutor of the Supreme Court
 The Chief justice and the Head prosecutor of the Audiencia Nacional
 Chief justices and Head prosecutors of the High Courts of Justice of the Autonomous Communities

Local authorities
 The Mayors of Madrid and Barcelona
 Mayors of cities considered big cities according to the law

Other institutions
 Members of the Council of State
 Members of the Court of Audit
 Members of the Instituto de España
 Academics of the eight Royal Academies
 Members of the Nuclear Security Council
 Deans of the College of Lawyers of the provinces where a High Court of Justice is seated
 The Governor of the Bank of Spain

Diplomacy
 Ambassadors
 Diplomats with the rank of Minister-Counselor

Military
 Flag officers of the Spanish Armed Forces and the Civil Guard

Recipients of civilian decorations, awards and orders
 Knights/Dames of the Collar and Knights/Dames Grand Cross of any of the military and civilian orders
 Holders of the Gold Medal of Merit in Labour

Nobility
 Grandees of Spain and their consorts
 Heirs of Grandees of Spain and their consorts

Other
 Foreign Heads of State not belonging to royalty (and their consorts) receive the style of His Excellency, while high-ranking officials of state receive the style of "The Most Excellent".

The Style of "His Excellency" in Spain
The style "His Excellency", which has a higher connotation than "The Most Excellent", is instead reserved for the children of an Infante or Infanta, who have the rank (but not the title) of Grandees.

During Francoist Spain, General Francisco Franco was the de facto Dictator of Spain and properly adopted the style His Excellency, since he was both Chief of State and Government, without being a "royal".

Other countries

Hispanic countries
Following the tradition from Spain, Hispanic countries adopted the styles "His Excellency" and "The Most Excellent" although they are informally used most of the time without following rules of style.

Properly used, the style "His Excellency" (or simply "Excellency") is reserved for Chiefs of State and/or Government in Republics, i.e. the President and Vice-President of the Republic. Also, though informally, this style applies for the "President of Congress" (or equivalent) and the "President of the Supreme Courts" (or equivalent). Former Presidents and Vice-Presidents of Republics usually retain the style "His/Her Excellency" after finishing their terms, as an honorific.

The style "The Most Excellent" (Excelentísimo Señor/a) applies to high-ranking officials of Republican countries that are not Chiefs of State or Government, i.e. a Minister, a Governor, an elected official.

Ambassadors of Foreign Countries also receive the style "The Most Excellent", although informally they are addressed as "Excellency".

Other countries
In other countries, "His Excellency" and "The Most Excellent" are rarely used. San Marino’s Captain Regents are styled as "The Most Excellent".

In the United States, albeit rarely, the President of the Nation is styled "Excellency". The more British-style "The Honourable" is preferred for Senators, Representatives and other elected officials.

In European monarchies or former monarchies, the style "His Excellency" is rarely used. "The Most Excellent" is sometimes given to members of the minor nobility, i.e. Viscounts and/or Barons.

See also
The Most Illustrious

Notes

Titles in Spain
Styles (forms of address)
Superlatives